Felipe Ferreira may refer to:

 Felipe Ferreira (footballer, born 1988), Brazilian retired football midfielder
 Felipe Ferreira (footballer, born 1994), Brazilian football midfielder for Botafogo